Radio transient could refer to :

In radio astronomy :
 Rotating radio transient
 Galactic Center radio transient
 Fast radio burst, milliseconds, most are one-offs, a few repeat
 pulsar, radio pulses from a rotating neutron star
 new phenomena such as GLEAM-X J162759.5−523504.3 (18 min period) reported in 2022.